Rhaebo glaberrimus is a species of toad in the family Bufonidae. Its common name is Cundinamarca toad, after its type locality, "Bogota", Cundinamarca, although this location is likely to be incorrectly reported. It is found in eastern Amazonian Colombia (Amazonas, Casanare, Boyacá, Cundinamarca, and Meta Departments), including the lower eastern slopes of the Cordillera Oriental to  asl, and adjacent Venezuela (Táchira state). Rhaebo ecuadorensis from Ecuador and Peru was formerly confused with this species. It has also been confused with Rhaebo guttatus.

Description
Males measure  and females  in snout–vent length. The colouration is variable. Dorsal colour varies from greenish brown to dark brown, with or without dark marks. Ventral colour varies from dark brown with cream spots to cream with dark marks. Iris is coppery-golden or brown with black or golden punctuations.

Habitat and conservation
Its natural habitats are lowland tropical rainforests and montane humid forests. It is locally threatened by habitat loss.

References

glaberrimus
Amphibians of Colombia
Amphibians of Venezuela
Taxonomy articles created by Polbot
Amphibians described in 1869
Taxa named by Albert Günther